Matthew Todd (born 14 June 2001) is a Scottish football player who plays as a right-back for Dunfermline Athletic. Todd previously had a loan spell with Brechin City.

Career
Todd was one of six players to join Dunfermline Athletic in May 2018 after graduating from Fife Elite Football Academy. He had previously taken part in a number of Dunfermline matches, and scored in a Fife Cup match against Burntisland Shipyard, which was abandoned after 50 minutes due to a serious injury to Pars player Aaron Splaine.

Todd made his first appearance after signing with the club in a Scottish Challenge Cup victory over Inverness Caledonian Thistle, playing the full 90 minutes. His first league appearance came in a 3–0 win over Partick Thistle, where he replaced Kallum Higginbotham in the final minutes of the match.

In September 2020, Todd moved on season-long loan to Scottish League Two side Brechin City. Following the postponement of football in the Scottish lower leagues in January 2021, Todd was recalled by his parent club.

Career statistics

References

External links
 
 

2001 births
Living people
Scottish footballers
Association football midfielders
Dunfermline Athletic F.C. players
Brechin City F.C. players
Scottish Professional Football League players